Maurice Braun (1877–1941) was an American artist who became known for his Impressionist landscapes of southern California. He was born in Hungary on October 1, 1877; however, by the age of four, young Maurice and the Braun family had migrated to United States, and settled in New York City. His professional studies took him to the National Academy of Design, where he studied the French tradition under Francis C. Jones, George W. Maynard and Edgar M. Ward.

In 1901 Braun trained under the American painter William Merritt Chase. He established himself as a figure and portrait painter in New York City, but in 1909 he left for California. Maurice Braun died in San Diego, California, on November 7, 1941.

Awards 

Hallgarten Prize, National Academy of Design, 1900
Gold Medal, Panama-California Exposition, San Diego, 1915–16

Memberships 

Salmagundi Club
Laguna Beach Art Association
San Diego Fine Arts Association

Galleries and Public Collections 
Steven Stern Fine Arts, Beverly Hills, CA
Maurice Braun Gallery, California
Houston Museum, Texas
Laguna Art Museum, California
Irvine Museum, Irvine, California
Los Angeles County Museum of Art
San Diego History Center
San Diego Museum of Art
The Redfern Gallery Laguna Beach, CA
William A. Karges Fine Art
K. Nathan Gallery  La Jolla, California
Art Museum of Greater Lafayette

References 

Literature: Second Nature, Four Early San Diego Landscape Painters by Milton E. Peterson, 1991;
Literature: Artists in California, 1786-1940, by Edan Milton Hughes, 1989;
Literature: Plein Air Painters of the Southland, by Ruth Lily Westphal, 1996.

External links
Paintings by Maurice Braun, an exhibition catalog from The Metropolitan Museum of Art Libraries (fully available online as PDF)
Works by Maurice Braun, WikiArt

Modern painters
American Impressionist painters
19th-century American painters
American male painters
20th-century American painters
Painters from California
People from San Diego
1877 births
1941 deaths
19th-century American male artists
20th-century American male artists
Austro-Hungarian emigrants to the United States